The 2010–11 Cruz Azul season is the 64th professional season of Mexico's top-flight football league. The season is split into two tournaments—the Torneo Apertura and the Torneo Clausura—each with identical formats and each contested by the same eighteen teams. Cruz Azul will begin their season on July 23, 2010 against Estudiantes Tecos. Cruz Azul will play their homes games on Saturdays at 17:00 hours local time.

Club

Personnel

Coaching staff

Current Kit 
Provider: Umbro
Sponsors: Cemento Cruz Azul, Coca-Cola, Telcel

Current squad 
As of January 2011: Listed on the official website of Cruz Azul.

From youth system

Transfers

Summer

In and Loan

Out and Loan

Winter

In and Loan

Out and Loan

Competitions 

Cruz Azul play three different tournaments in the 2010–11 season are Apertura 2010, CONCACAF Champions League and Clausura 2011.

Overall

Competitions statistics

2010 Torneo Apertura 

Kickoff times are in CTZ or CST=UTC−06:00 and DST=UTC−05:00.

2010 Summer pre-season 
Before the season

Friendly during the season

Regular phase

General table

Group table

Final phase 

Quarter-finals

UNAM won 2-3 in aggregate.

CONCACAF Champions League 

Kickoff times are in CTZ or CST=UTC−06:00 and DST=UTC−05:00.

Preliminary round 

Cruz Azul won 9-2 in aggregate.

Group stage

Group table

Quarterfinals 

Cruz Azul won 5-1 in aggregate.

Semi-finals 

Monterrey won 3-2 in aggregate.

2011 Torneo Clausura 
Kickoff times are in CTZ or CST=UTC−06:00 and DST=UTC−05:00.

2010 Winter pre-season 

Before the season

Friendly during the season

Regular phase

General table

Group table

Final phase 

Quarter-finals

Cruz Azul won 1-2 in aggregate.

Semi-finals

Squad statistics

Start formations

Starting 11 

|-----
!style="background: #C0C0C0;color:white" colspan="6"| 11 starters
|-----

|-----
!style="background: #C0C0C0;color:white" colspan="6"| Other starters
|-----

Apps and Goals

Discipline 

{| class="wikitable sortable" style="text-align:center"
|-
!width="32"|  
!width="32"|  
!Player  
!style="background: #FFEE99"|
!style="background: #FFEE99"|
!style="background: #FF8888"|
!style="background: #FFEE99"|
!style="background: #FFEE99"|
!style="background: #FF8888"|
!style="background: #FFEE99"|
!style="background: #FFEE99"|
!style="background: #FF8888"|
!style="background: #FFEE99"|
!style="background: #FFEE99"|
!style="background: #FF8888"|
|-
|align="left"|1||align="left"|GK||align="left"| Jesús Corona
|0||1||0||0||0||0||1||0||0||1||1||0
|-
|align="left"|12||align="left"|GK||align="left"| Guillermo Allison
|0||0||0||0||0||0||0||0||0||0||0||0
|-
|align="left"|25||align="left"|GK||align="left"| Yosgart Gutiérrez
|0||0||0||0||0||0||0||0||0||0||0||0
|-
|align="left"|2||align="left"|DF||align="left"| Fausto Pinto
|3||0||0||1||1||0||2||0||0||6||1||0
|-
|align="left"|4||align="left"|DF||align="left"| Julio César Domínguez
|0||0||0||0||0||0||1||0||0||1||0||0
|-
|align="left"|5||align="left"|DF||align="left"| Alejandro Castro
|3||0||0||1||0||0||3||0||0||7||0||0
|-
|align="left"|14||align="left"|DF||align="left"| Nestor Araújo
|0||0||0||0||0||0||3||0||0||3||0||0
|-
|align="left"|15||align="left"|DF||align="left"| Horacio Cervantes
|5||2||0||2||0||0||8||0||1||15||2||1
|-
|align="left"|16||align="left"|DF||align="left"| Rogelio Chávez
|0||0||0||0||0||0||0||0||0||0||0||0
|-
|align="left"|22||align="left"|DF||align="left"| Adrián Cortés
|0||0||0||1||0||0||0||0||0||1||0||0
|-
|align="left"|23||align="left"|DF||align="left"| Hiram Mondragón
|0||0||0||0||0||0||0||0||0||0||0||0
|-
|align="left"|26||align="left"|DF||align="left"| Waldo Ponce
|_||_||_||0||1||0||8||0||0||8||1||0
|-
|align="left"|28||align="left"|DF||align="left"| Gienir García
|1||0||0||1||0||0||0||0||0||2||0||0
|-
|align="left"|3||align="left"|MF||align="left"| Marcelo Palau
|_||_||_||2||0||0||5||0||0||7||0||0
|-
|align="left"|6||align="left"|MF||align="left"| Gerardo Torrado
|7||0||0||3||0||0||6||0||0||16||0||0
|-
|align="left"|7||align="left"|MF||align="left"| Javier Aquino
|1||0||0||0||0||0||2||0||0||3||0||0
|-
|align="left"|8||align="left"|MF||align="left"| Gonzalo Pineda
|3||0||0||2||0||0||3||0||0||8||0||0
|-
|align="left"|10||align="left"|MF||align="left"| Christian Giménez
|6||0||0||3||1||0||3||0||1||12||1||1
|-
|align="left"|13||align="left"|MF||align="left"| Allam Bello
|0||0||0||1||0||0||0||0||0||1||0||0
|-
|align="left"|17||align="left"|MF||align="left"| Diego De la Cruz
|0||0||0||0||0||0||0||0||0||0||0||0
|-
|align="left"|18||align="left"|MF||align="left"| César Villaluz
|1||0||0||2||0||0||3||0||0||6||0||0
|-
|align="left"|19||align="left"|MF||align="left"| Hugo Droguett
|_||_||_||1||0||0||0||0||0||1||0||0
|-
|align="left"|20||align="left"|MF||align="left"| Germán Rodríguez
|0||0||0||0||0||0||0||0||0||0||0||0
|-
|align="left"|21||align="left"|MF||align="left"| Héctor Gutiérrez
|2||0||0||1||0||0||1||0||0||4||0||0
|-
|align="left"|24||align="left"|MF||align="left"| Luis Alanis
|0||0||0||0||0||0||0||0||0||0||0||0
|-
|align="left"|9||align="left"|FW||align="left"| Isaac Romo
|_||_||_||0||0||0||1||0||1||1||0||1
|-
|align="left"|11||align="left"|FW||align="left"| Alejandro Vela
|2||0||0||0||0||0||_||_||_||2||0||0
|-
|align="left"|27||align="left"|FW||align="left"| Javier Orozco
|0||0||0||1||0||0||0||0||0||1||0||0
|-
|align="left"|29||align="left"|FW||align="left"| Martín Galván
|0||0||0||0||0||0||0||0||0||0||0||0
|-
|align="left"|30||align="left"|FW||align="left"| Emanuel Villa
|3||0||0||3||0||0||4||0||0||10||0||0
|-
|align="left"|59||align="left"|GK||align="left"| Christian Barrientos
|0||0||0||0||0||0||0||0||0||0||0||0
|-
|align="left"|OUT||align="left"|DF||align="left"| Joel Huiqui
|2||0||0||1||0||0||_||_||_||3||0||0
|-
|align="left"|OUT||align="left"|FW||align="left"| Maximiliano Biancucchi
|0||0||0||1||0||0||_||_||_||1||0||0
|- class="sortbottom"

.

Overall 
{|class="wikitable" style="text-align: center;"
|-
!style="background: #6050DC;color:white"|
!style="background: #6050DC;color:white"|Total
!style="background: #6050DC;color:white"| Home
!style="background: #6050DC;color:white"| Away
|-
|align=left| Games played || 52 || 26  || 26
|-
|align=left| Games won    || 29 || 19  || 10
|-
|align=left| Games drawn  || 11 || 5  || 6
|-
|align=left| Games lost   || 12 || 2  || 10
|-
|align=left| Biggest win (Apertura)  || 0–3 vs Estudiantes, 4–1 vs Pachuca, 3-0 vs Querétaro, 3-0 vs Santos || 4–1 vs Pachuca, 3-0 vs Querétaro, 3-0 vs Santos || 0–3 vs Estudiantes
|-
|align=left| Biggest win (CONCACAF)  || 6–0 vs San Francisco, 0–6 vs Árabe Unido || 6–0 vs San Francisco || 0–6 vs Árabe Unido
|-
|align=left| Biggest win (Clausura)  || 0-4 vs Pachuca || 4-1 vs Estudiantes, 3-0 vs Monterrey || 0-4 vs Pachuca
|-
|align=left| Biggest lose (Apertura)    || 2–0 & 0-2 vs UNAM || 0–2 vs UNAM || 2–0 vs UNAM
|-
|align=left| Biggest lose (CONCACAF)    || 1-3 vs Real Salt Lake || - - - - - || 1-3 vs Real Salt Lake
|-
|align=left| Biggest lose (Clausura)    || 3-0 vs Atlante, 3-0 vs Santos, 3-0 vs Morelia || 2-3 vs Morelia || 3-0 vs Atlante, 3-0 vs Santos, 3-0 vs Morelia
|-
|align=left| Goals scored    || 95 || 56 || 39
|-
|align=left| Goals conceded  || 55 || 20 || 34
|-
|align=left| Goal difference || +40 || +36 || +4
|-
|-
|-
|align=left| Most Game Started || 48 || colspan=2|  Emanuel Villa
|-
|align=left| Most appearances || 49 || colspan=2| Christian Giménez & Emanuel Villa
|-
|align=left| Top scorer      || 23 || colspan=2|  Emanuel Villa
|-
|align=left| Points          || 98/156 (%) || 62/78 (%) || 36/78 (%)
|-
|align=left| Winning rate    || 29/52 (%) || 19/26 (%) || 10/26 (%)
|-

Goalscorers

Goal minutes 
Updated to games played on 13 May 2011.

Results

Apertura 2010

Results summary

Results by round

CONCACAF Champions League

Results summary

Results by round

Clausura 2011

Results summary

Results by round

IFFHS Ranking 
Cruz Azul position on the Club World Ranking during the 2010-11 season, according to IFFHS.

References

External links 

Cruz Azul
2010–11 Primera División de México season
Mexican football clubs 2010–11 season